Ctenoplusia is a genus of moths of the family Noctuidae.

Species
 Ctenoplusia accentifera Lefèbvre, 1827
 Ctenoplusia adiaphora Dufay, 1974
 Ctenoplusia aeneofusa Hampson, 1894
 Ctenoplusia aenescens Prout, 1921
 Ctenoplusia agnata Staudinger, 1892
 Ctenoplusia albostriata Bremer & Grey, 1853
 Ctenoplusia amydra Dufay, 1972
 Ctenoplusia armata Behounek & Ronkay, 1999
 Ctenoplusia asteia Dufay, 1972
 Ctenoplusia astrapaea Dufay, 1972
 Ctenoplusia aurisuta Dufay, 1968
 Ctenoplusia caelata Dufay, 1972
 Ctenoplusia calceolaris (Walker, [1858])
 Ctenoplusia camptogamma Hampson, 1910
 Ctenoplusia caudata Schaus, 1906
 Ctenoplusia chalcopasta Hampson, 1912
 Ctenoplusia crinoides Dufay, 1972
 Ctenoplusia dargei Dufay, 1972
 Ctenoplusia dorfmeisteri Felder, 1874
 Ctenoplusia dufanyi Behounek & Ronkay, 1999
 Ctenoplusia edora Prout, 1927
 Ctenoplusia epargyra Dufay, 1968
 Ctenoplusia etiennei Dufay, 1975
 Ctenoplusia euchroa Hampson, 1918
 Ctenoplusia euchroides Carcasson, 1965
 Ctenoplusia eugrapha Hampson, 1913
 Ctenoplusia fracta Walker, [1858]
 Ctenoplusia fulgens Dufay, 1972
 Ctenoplusia furcifera Walker, [1858]
 Ctenoplusia gammaloba Hampson, 1910
 Ctenoplusia gemmata Dufay, 1972
 Ctenoplusia glaphyra Dufay, 1982
 Ctenoplusia griveaudi Dufay, 1968
 Ctenoplusia guenei Wallengren, 1856
 Ctenoplusia herbuloti Dufay, 1982
 Ctenoplusia ichinosei Dufay, 1965
 Ctenoplusia indica Ronkay, 1986
 Ctenoplusia isospila Dufay, 1972
 Ctenoplusia javana Behounek & Ronkay, 1999
 Ctenoplusia karthalae Dufay, 1982
 Ctenoplusia kobesi Behounek & Thöny, 1997
 Ctenoplusia kosemponensis Strand, 1920
 Ctenoplusia latistigma Prout, 1922
 Ctenoplusia lavendula Hampson, 1902
 Ctenoplusia leucostigma Dufay, 1968
 Ctenoplusia limbirena Guenée, 1852
 Ctenoplusia mapongua Holland, 1894
 Ctenoplusia melanocephala Möschler, 1884
 Ctenoplusia micans Dufay, 1968
 Ctenoplusia microptera Ronkay, 1989
 Ctenoplusia molybdina Dufay, 1968
 Ctenoplusia mutans Walker, 1865
 Ctenoplusia nigrogemmea Romieux, 1943
 Ctenoplusia obtusisigna Walker, [1858]
 Ctenoplusia ogovana Holland, 1894
 Ctenoplusia orbifer Guenée, 1865
 Ctenoplusia oxygramma Geyer, 1832
 Ctenoplusia pauliana Dufay, 1968
 Ctenoplusia perispomena Dufay, 1972
 Ctenoplusia perplexa Dufay, 1975
 Ctenoplusia petraea Dufay, 1972
 Ctenoplusia phocea Hampson, 1910
 Ctenoplusia phoceoides Dufay, 1972
 Ctenoplusia placida Moore, [1884]
 Ctenoplusia polycampta Dufay, 1972
 Ctenoplusia porphyrea Dufay, 1970
 Ctenoplusia proseides Dufay, 1972
 Ctenoplusia psileia Dufay, 1975
 Ctenoplusia rhodographa Dufay, 1968
 Ctenoplusia rubronitens Dufay, 1972
 Ctenoplusia scoteina Dufay, 1972
 Ctenoplusia selagisma Dufay, 1972
 Ctenoplusia seyrigi Dufay, 1968
 Ctenoplusia siculifera Holland, 1894
 Ctenoplusia sigillata Dufay, 1970
 Ctenoplusia sumbawana Behounek & Ronkay, 1999
 Ctenoplusia tarassota Hampson, 1913
 Ctenoplusia triteia Dufay, 1972
 Ctenoplusia vermiculata Dufay, 1970
 Ctenoplusia vittata Wallengren, 1856

References
 Ctenoplusia at Markku Savela's Lepidoptera and Some Other Life Forms
 Natural History Museum Lepidoptera genus database

Plusiinae